Ayatollah Seyed Esmaeil Mousavi Zanjani (was born 1928 — died 2002) was an Iranian Shiite cleric and politician. He was a member of the 1st, 2nd and 3rd Assembly of Experts from the Zanjan Province electorate. He was imam Jumu'ah for Zanjan and Representative of the Supreme Leader in Zanjan Province in the period after Iranian Revolution until his death.

Influence
Zanjani was influenced by Mir Asadollah Madani, Imam Khomeini, Seyyed Hossein Borujerdi, and Mohaghegh Damad.

See also 

 List of members in the First Term of the Council of Experts
List of members in the Second Term of the Council of Experts
List of members in the Third Term of the Council of Experts

References 

People from Zanjan, Iran
20th-century Iranian judges
Members of the Assembly of Experts
2002 deaths
1928 births
Iranian ayatollahs
Al-Moussawi family
Members of the Assembly of Experts for Constitution
Burials at Fatima Masumeh Shrine